Bad Meets Evil is an American hip hop duo composed of Detroit-based rappers Royce da 5'9" (Bad) and Eminem (Evil). Bad Meets Evil was formed in 1998, thanks to the duo's mutual friend, Proof. The group's name comes from the song "Bad Meets Evil" on The Slim Shady LP in 1999, which featured Royce da 5'9". Their discography consists of one extended play (EP) and four singles. In 1999, the duo released a double non-album single, "Nuttin' to Do" and "Scary Movies"; the former peaked at 36 on the Hot Rap Songs chart, while the latter peaked at 63 on the UK Singles Chart and was featured on the soundtrack of the 2000 horror comedy parody film Scary Movie.

The duo broke up after a feud between Royce and the members of Eminem's group D12. The feud ended when Proof, a D12 member and Eminem's best friend, as well as a friend of Royce's, was killed in April 2006. After Royce's super-group Slaughterhouse signed to the Eminem-founded record label Shady Records, a reunion of Bad Meets Evil followed with the extended play Hell: The Sequel (2011), which reached number one on the US Billboard 200 and was certified gold by the Recording Industry Association of America (RIAA) and the Australian Recording Industry Association (ARIA). The album is now eligible for platinum certification in US. The EP's lead single "Fast Lane" peaked at number 32 on the Billboard Hot 100, while the second single "Lighters", featuring Bruno Mars, peaked at number four on the same chart. The duo returned in 2014 for the 15-year anniversary album of Shady Records, Shady XV, for "Vegas", and again in 2015 to record two tracks for the boxing film Southpaw, titled "All I Think About" and "Raw". The duo have recently reunited for the song "Not Alike" on Eminem's album Kamikaze (2018). Eminem was also featured on Royce's song "Caterpillar" on his album Book of Ryan (2018). Most recently Royce featured on Eminem's album Music To Be Murdered By (2020) with three songs, "You Gon' Learn", "Yah Yah" and "I Will". On the song "Godzilla" from the same album, Eminem confirms that the duo are still active by rapping ("pack heat, but it's black ink
Evil half of the Bad Meets
Evil, that means take a back seat").

Music career

Formation and subsequent break-up
Eminem met Royce da 5'9" in 1997 when Royce was opening for entertainer Usher at the Palladium. Eminem and Royce da 5'9", became quick friends before Eminem's rise to fame, and collaborated on the track which led to the duo's foundation, "Bad Meets Evil", for Eminem's 1999 major label debut The Slim Shady LP. The duo's first work, a 1999 double-single, which was originally recorded in 1998, consisting of "Nuttin' to Do" and "Scary Movies", achieved respectable chart success, peaking at 36 on the Hot Rap Songs chart, while the latter peaked at 63 on the UK Singles Chart. A year later, the song "Scary Movies" was featured on the soundtrack of the horror comedy parody film Scary Movie.

"Renegade" was originally a song featuring Eminem recorded for Royce's first studio debut album Rock City (2002), but Royce's verses were later replaced with Jay-Z's for his 2001 album The Blueprint. Jay-Z contacted Eminem for a collaboration and beat while the song was being made. Limited in time for production, Eminem sent Jay-Z the beat for "Renegade" with approval from Royce. However, Eminem was still featured on Royce's Rock City album, on the title track.

Dr. Dre heard one of Royce's mix tapes through Eminem, deciding to sign him to Aftermath Entertainment. Eminem secured him a ghostwriting position on Dre's second studio album, 2001. After his manager Kino stated: "I've seen Em sit Dre down like a pupil and coach him on rhymes" on a phone interview, Dr. Dre requested that Royce cut ties with his manager. Royce refused to fire his manager, thus his relationship with Dre ended.

After Royce turned down Eminem's offer to join his Anger Management Tour as a hype man, Proof, member of Eminem's band D12 and his best friend, also a good friend of Royce's, took the place. Later, Royce wanted to continue working with Eminem, who was busy working with D12, which led Royce to believe that D12 was "souring" his relationship with Eminem. A feud with a series of diss tracks followed, resulting in the duo's break up.

Reunion
In 2011, Royce's rap group Slaughterhouse signed to Eminem's founded label Shady Records. This led to a reunion of Bad Meets Evil with the debut extended play Hell: The Sequel, released on June 14, 2011 after 11 years of inactivity in the group. A chart success, it peaked at number one on the Billboard 200 and was certified gold by the Recording Industry Association of America (RIAA) and the Australian Recording Industry Association (ARIA).

"Fast Lane" was released on May 3, 2011 as the lead single. It was recorded by Mike Strange at Effigy Studios (Ferndale, Michigan). Recorded a few months before its release, the song was written by Eminem, Royce da 5'9" and Sly "Pyper" Jordan, who also sings the chorus to the song with additional vocals from Denaun Porter. Eminem requested that Sly perform the chorus, after hearing Dr. Dre's hit single "Kush". Supa Dups and Jason "JG" Gilbert produced the song; Eminem and Mike Strange mixed the song. JG and Supa Dups also sample their own vocals. According to Supa Dups, he was asked to make a beat with JG, without knowing it was for Bad Meets Evil. He said that "[They] didn't even have Eminem in mind [when they made the beat]." According to this interview with Mixtape Daily, Supa Dups had little knowledge about the project, but simply submitted the beat to Eminem. Months after recording the song, on April 28, 2011, when it leaked onto the Internet, Supa Dups was impressed by the finished version, lyrically, and was proud to have participated in the project. The song peaked at number 34 on the Hot 100 chart.

The second single, "Lighters", was originally intended to be featured on Royce's fifth studio album, Success Is Certain, but the single itself had ended up on Hell: The Sequel. It was produced solely by Rochester, New York producer Battle Roy. After Royce had presented the track to Eminem, he was inspired to write and record the first verse, prompting Royce to write his the day afterwards. Bad Meets Evil then flew to Los Angeles, where R&B and pop singer Bruno Mars heard the song. Eminem and Mars then made minor changes to the musical arrangement. The song was recorded at Effigy Studios by Strange, Isolation Studios by Asar and Levcon Studios (Los Angeles, California) by Ari Levine of The Smeezingtons, a music production and songwriting group consisting of Philip Lawrence and Mars. Eminem, The Smeezingtons and Battle Roy produced the song. Battle Roy and Joe Strange also engineered the song. Luis Resto provided additional keyboards for the song. On May 25, 2011, when the track listing of Hell: The Sequel was announced, "Lighters" was revealed to the public to feature Mars. "Lighters" hit contemporary hit radio on July 5, 2011 as the second single from the EP. "Lighters" performed better on the charts than "Fast Lane", peaking at number four on the Hot 100 chart.

Bad Meets Evil released a new song, entitled "Vegas", for the compilation album Shady XV, which was released on November 24, 2014 through Shady Records.

In 2015, two new Bad Meets Evil songs were released. The two songs, "All I Think About" and "Raw" appear on the Southpaw Soundtrack, produced by Shady Records.

In 2018, two Bad Meets Evil songs were released "Caterpillar" which featured Eminem off Royce's Book of Ryan album and "Not Alike" which featured Royce off Eminem's Kamikaze album.

Discography

EPs

Singles

Music videos

See also 
 Royce da 5'9" discography
 Eminem albums discography
 Eminem singles discography

References

Detroit hip hop groups
Eminem
American musical duos
Shady Records artists
Hip hop duos
Male musical duos
Musical groups established in 1998
Musical groups disestablished in 2002
Musical groups reestablished in 2011
1998 establishments in Michigan
Hip hop supergroups